Tapio Valfrid Mäkelä (12 October 1926 – 12 May 2016) was a Finnish cross-country skier who competed in the 1950s.

He won the 4 × 10 km relay gold and the 18 km silver at the 1952 Winter Olympics in Oslo.

Mäkelä also won a gold in the 4 × 10 km relay at the 1954 FIS Nordic World Ski Championships.

Cross-country skiing results
All results are sourced from the International Ski Federation (FIS).

Olympic Games
 2 medals – (1 gold, 1 silver)

World Championships
 1 medal – (1 gold)

References

External links
 
 

1926 births
2016 deaths
People from Nastola
Finnish male cross-country skiers
Olympic cross-country skiers of Finland
Cross-country skiers at the 1952 Winter Olympics
Olympic gold medalists for Finland
Olympic silver medalists for Finland
Olympic medalists in cross-country skiing
FIS Nordic World Ski Championships medalists in cross-country skiing
Medalists at the 1952 Winter Olympics
Sportspeople from Päijät-Häme
20th-century Finnish people